Kenneth Lyle Genge (born 25 October 1933) is a Canadian retired Anglican bishop.

Genge was educated at the University of Saskatchewan and ordained in 1958. He held incumbencies at Fort Pitt, Shellbrook, Yellowknife and St Michael and All Angels' Calgary. He was a conference retreat centre director from 1985 to 1988 when he became the Bishop of Edmonton.  He retired in 1996.

References

1933 births
University of Saskatchewan alumni
20th-century Anglican Church of Canada bishops
Anglican bishops of Edmonton
Living people